The Alfred H. and Mary E. Smith House is a house located in southwest Portland, Oregon listed on the National Register of Historic Places.

See also
 National Register of Historic Places listings in Southwest Portland, Oregon

References

1912 establishments in Oregon
Bungalow architecture in Oregon
Houses completed in 1912
Houses on the National Register of Historic Places in Portland, Oregon
Joseph Jacobberger buildings
Southwest Hills, Portland, Oregon